The following table indicates the party of elected officials in the U.S. state of Montana:
Governor
Lieutenant Governor
Secretary of State
Attorney General
State Treasurer
State Auditor
Superintendent of Public Instruction

The table also indicates the historical party composition in the:
State Senate
State House of Representatives
State delegation to the United States Senate
State delegation to the United States House of Representatives

For years in which a presidential election was held, the table indicates which party's nominees received the state's electoral votes.

Pre-statehood (1864–1889)

1889–1976

1977–present

References

See also
Politics in Montana

Politics of Montana
Government of Montana
Montana